"Ennui" is a sonnet by Sylvia Plath published for the first time in November 2006 in the online literary journal Blackbird. Sylvia Plath wrote the Petrarchan sonnet "Ennui" during her undergraduate years at Smith College.

The first appearance of "Ennui" in print received international attention, from New York City to New Delhi. Reports on the poem were featured in the New York Times, the Washington Post, the Guardian Unlimited, the International Herald Tribune, and other journals.

References

External links
 Scan of final draft at the Blackbird Archive 
 Blog of Charles Bainbridge, with comments of others

Poetry by Sylvia Plath
2006 poems
Works originally published in American magazines
Works originally published in literary magazines
Works originally published in online magazines
Poems published posthumously
American poems